Thomas Anthony "Tony" Salmons (born January 1, 1957) is an American alternative comic book artist, film storyboard artist and character designer.

Biography

Born in Rolla, Missouri, Salmons grew up in Casa Grande, Arizona, with stops in New York City and San Francisco. Salmons now lives and works in Los Angeles and has two daughters.

Salmons illustrated the comic book mini-series The Strange Adventures of H.P. Lovecraft, from Image Comics, later collected in trade paperback.

Works

Television
 Batman: The Animated Series, Season 1, 1992, Warner Bros.
 Æon Flux, 1995, MTV.

Books/Comics
 Amazing High Adventure #1, 1984, Marvel.
 Batman: Gotham Knights #4, 2000, DC.
 Batman: Legends of the Dark Knight #85, 1996, DC.
 Captain America: Red, White & Blue, hardcover, 2002, Marvel.
 Conan Saga #76, 1984, Marvel.
 2000 AD, Crisis #40, 1990, Fleetway.
 Dakota North #1-5, 1986–87, Marvel.
 Dark Horse Presents #6-7, 9-10, 1986, Dark Horse.
 Doctor Strange #64, 1984, Marvel.
 Doomed #2, 2006, IDW.
 Dragon's Teeth #1, 1983, Clegg.
 First Six-Pack #2, First.
 The Foot Soldiers #2, 1997, Image.
 411 #1, 2003, Marvel.
 Gangland #4, 1998, DC/Vertigo.
 G.I. Joe: A Real American Hero #69, 87-88, 91, 1988–89, Marvel.
 G.I. Joe Yearbook #4, 1988, Marvel.
 Heartthrobs #2, 1998, DC/Vertigo.
 Heroes Against Hunger #1, 1986, DC.
 Jon Sable Freelance #54-55, 1987–88, First.
 Justice #5, 1987, Marvel.
 The Mark #1, 1987, Dark Horse.
 Marvel Comics Presents #9, 1988, Marvel.
 Marvel Fanfare #17, 19, 27, 1984–86, Marvel.
 Marvel Vision #16, 28, 1997–98, Marvel.
 Nightmask #1, 1986, Marvel.
 Penthouse Comix #22-23, 1997, Penthouse.
 Penthouse Men's Adventure Comix #3, 1995, Penthouse.
 Peter Porker #8, 1986, Marvel.
 Savage Sword of Conan #107, 109, 113, 118, 165, 1984–85, 1989, Marvel.
 Savage Tales #3, 1985, Marvel.
 Star Wars #91, 1985, Marvel.
 Strange Adventures of HP Lovecraft #1-4, 2008–2009, Image.
 Taboo #9, 1995, Kitchen Sink.
 Timeslip Collection #1, 1998, Marvel.
 Vigilante: City Lights, Prairie Justice #1-4, 1995, DC/Vertigo.
 ''Web of Spider-Man Annual #1, 1985, Marvel.

References

External links
Tony Salmons website
The Strange Adventures of HP Lovecraft comic book site

1957 births
Living people
People from Rolla, Missouri
American comics artists
American storyboard artists
People from Casa Grande, Arizona
DC Comics people
Marvel Comics people